Cedro is an uninhabited rural barrio in the municipality of Guayanilla, Puerto Rico. Its population in 2010 was 0.

Features and demographics
Cedro has  of land area and no water area. Historically, Cedro has had a low population and in 2010, its population was 0.

See also

 List of communities in Puerto Rico

References

Barrios of Guayanilla, Puerto Rico